Isostola thabena is a moth of the family Erebidae. It was described by Paul Dognin in 1919. It is found in Colombia.

References

 Natural History Museum Lepidoptera generic names catalog

Arctiinae
Moths described in 1919